Bolter End Sand Pit is a  geological Site of Special Scientific Interest in Bolter End in Buckinghamshire. It is a Geological Conservation Review site.

The site is a disused sand pit. It is part of the Reading Beds, and dates to 53 million years ago. It has an unusual pebble content for Reading Beds, and is important for palaeogeographical reconstructions as it appears to represent a riverine sequence with sources from Lower Cretaceous and Upper Jurassic sequences.

The site is on private land with no public access.

References

Sites of Special Scientific Interest in Buckinghamshire
Geological Conservation Review sites